Mordellistenoda melana is a beetle in the genus Mordellistenoda of the family Mordellidae. It was described in 1995 by Fan & Yang.

References

Mordellidae
Beetles described in 1995